Phytoliriomyza clara is a species of leaf miner fly in the family Agromyzidae. It feeds on bracken.

References

Agromyzidae
Articles created by Qbugbot
Insects described in 1913